From its formal chartering on 22 July 1686 until 1779, the mayors of Albany, New York, were appointed by the royal governor of New York, per the provisions of the original city charter, issued by Governor Thomas Dongan.

From 1779 until 1839, mayors were chosen by the New York State's Council of Appointment, typically for a one-year term that began in September. From 1840 on, Albany's mayors were directly elected by the city's residents. Beginning in 1886, mayoral terms began on January 1 of the year after the mayor was elected.

A total of 74 men and one woman have served as mayor since the city's inception; eighteen of them served multiple terms that were not consecutive. Erastus Corning 2nd served for over 40 years, longer than any other mayor of any other major United States city. Kathy Sheehan (Democrat) is the current mayor; she was first elected in 2013, began service on January 1, 2014, and is currently in her second term of office.

Seventeenth century

Eighteenth century

Nineteenth century

Twentieth century

Twenty-first century

See also
 Mayoral elections in Albany, New York

References
Source for the names and years: Mayors of Albany, 1686-1997: Biographical Sketches, Virginia B. Bowers, City Historian (City Club of Albany, Inc., 1997)
 
 Mayor Erastus Corning: Albany Icon, Albany Enigma, Paul Grondahl (Washington Park Press, Albany, 2004)

Albany, New York